Hobo Hill Historic District is a national historic district located in Jefferson City, Cole County, Missouri.  It encompasses seven contributing buildings in a predominantly residential section of Jefferson City. The district developed between about 1908 and 1916, and includes representative examples of Tudor Revival, Colonial Revival, Bungalow / American Craftsman, and American Foursquare style architecture.  Notable buildings include the Adolph Brandenberger House (1910).

It was listed on the National Register of Historic Places in 2013.

References

Historic districts on the National Register of Historic Places in Missouri
Tudor Revival architecture in Missouri
Colonial Revival architecture in Missouri
Bungalow architecture in Missouri
Buildings and structures in Cole County, Missouri
Buildings and structures in Jefferson City, Missouri
National Register of Historic Places in Cole County, Missouri